Fremantle Spirit Soccer Club was an Australian soccer club based in Fremantle, Western Australia. The Spirit played in the State League Division 1 (2012) dropping to Division 2 for 2013 of the Western Australia State League.

History
The club was established in 1978 as Benfica United with support from the Fremantle Portuguese Australian community. It was seen as a successor to the Associacao Portuguesa de Fremantle team that had played for a number of years from 1967. The club changed its name to Fremantle City in 1994 and to Fremantle Spirit in 2006.

In the 2013 Season the name of the club changed to Maddington White City after a merger with Maddington Eagles.

As of the end of the 2013 Season Fremantle Spirit SC and Maddington White City are no longer in existence.

Honours

Premier League
Winners
2000
Runners up 
1997

First Division
Winners
2006
Runners up 
1996
1994
1988

Second Division
Runners up 
1984

Third Division
Winners
1983

Night Series
Runners up 
1999
1998

Current squad

External links
 Official Website

Football West State League teams
Association football clubs established in 1978
1978 establishments in Australia
Soccer clubs in Perth, Western Australia